Diocese of Florida may refer to:

 Episcopal Diocese of Florida
 Roman Catholic Diocese of Florida